Rosenfelder is a surname. Notable people with the surname include:
 Charles Rosenfelder, American football player
 Ludwig Rosenfelder, German painter
 Mark Rosenfelder, American conlanger

See also
 Rosenfeld (disambiguation)